The 1938–39 Michigan Wolverines men's basketball team represented the University of Michigan in intercollegiate basketball during the 1938–39 season.  The team compiled an 11–9 record and 4–8 against Big Ten Conference opponents.  The team finished in a tie for seventh place in the Big Ten.

Bennie Oosterbaan was in his first year as the team's coach.  Leo Beebe was the team captain, and Edmund Thomas was the team's leading scorer with 140 points in 20 games for an average of 7.0 points per game.  Football star Tom Harmon appeared in 13 games for the basketball team and scored 100 points for an average of 7.7 points per game.

Scoring statistics

Coaching staff
Bennie Oosterbaan - coach
Fielding H. Yost - athletic director

References

Michigan
Michigan Wolverines men's basketball seasons
Michigan Wolverines basketball
Michigan Wolverines basketball